Stratenec is  AMSL high mountain in the Lesser Fatra.

This limestone mountain covered with dwarf-pines is situated in west part of the main crest of Krivanska Mala Fatra mountain range.

It is accessible directly on the red marked trail between Maly Krivan and Biele skaly. From the mountain Maly Krivan it is divided by saddleback Priehyb and from Biele Skala by the saddleback Vrata.

You can also reach it by the blue marked trail from Krasnany via the valley Kur. There is no marked trail to the rocky part and the access is restricted to the tourists. The area of the peak and the northern slopes are part of protected area Suchy.

The opposite southeastern slopes of Stratenec lead to the sucanska valley. Stratenec can be reached from that side by the yellow marked trail from Lipovec or by the green trail from Turcianske Klacany via Suchy.

External links

Mountains of Slovakia
Mountains of the Western Carpathians